The Touch is a 24-hour music format produced by Westwood One. It draws an adult audience between the ages of 25-49 with an Urban Adult Contemporary format since its inception by Satellite Music Network in 1972.

In January 2010, Citadel Broadcasting rebranded this network as MyFavStation, but a month later, it was reverted to its original legacy branding. That same month, veteran R&B radio announcer, Ron "The Nighttime Dog" Chavis, was brought in to host the seven night per week evening slot vacated by R&B crooner Brian McKnight.

Affiliates (partial list) 
 Albany, Georgia - WQVE
 Atlantic City, New Jersey - WTTH
 Demopolis, Alabama - WZNJ & WXAL
 Gulf Breeze, Florida - WRNE
 Holton, Michigan - WVIB
 Kalamazoo, Michigan - WTOU
 Liberty, Mississippi - WAZA
 South Bend, Indiana - WUBU
 Vicksburg, Mississippi - KSBU
 Selma, Alabama - WJAM

Former affiliates 
 Grand Rapids, Michigan - WJNZ 
 Natchez, Mississippi - KZKR
 Portage, Michigan - WTOU
 San Antonio, Texas - KSJL-AM-FM (early 1990s)
 Steubenville, Ohio - WIXZ
 St. Petersburg, Florida - WRBQ-AM (1992-1999)
 Toledo, Ohio - WIMX
 Wilmington, North Carolina - WJSI
 Bronxville, New York - WNBM

American radio networks
Urban adult contemporary radio stations in the United States
Westwood One